Broadstairs railway station is on the Chatham Main Line in England, serving the seaside town of Broadstairs, Kent.

The station and all trains that serve the station are operated by Southeastern.

History

The first proposal for a station at Broadstairs was by the South Eastern Railway (SER) in November 1859, who wanted to extend their existing station at Ramsgate towards Broadstairs at an estimated cost of £20,000. However, the scheme was refused permission by the station master at Ramsgate.

It opened on 5 October 1863. From the beginning, the line was operated by the London, Chatham & Dover Railway (LCDR), who bought the Kent Coast Railway on 1 July 1871.

The station was run by the Southern Railway (SR) following the Railways Act 1921. Having inherited lines from the LCDR and SER, the SR decided to simplify services by constructing a new line linking Broadstairs directly to the current Ramsgate station, thus joining the stations together and forming a loop along Kent. This opened on 2 July 1926.

Electric services began at Broadstairs on 15 June 1959. Goods services were withdrawn from the station on 3 June 1963. A high-speed service to London St Pancras began on 13 December 2009.

Incidents
In 2015, a woman was killed by a train at the station.

Services
All services at Broadstairs are operated by Southeastern  using  and  EMUs.

The typical off-peak service in trains per hour is:

 1 tph to London St Pancras International via  and 
 1 tph to London St Pancras International via  and 
 1 tph to  via Chatham 
 1 tph to 
 2 tph to 

References
Citations

Sources

External links

Broadstairs
Railway stations in Kent
DfT Category E stations
Former London, Chatham and Dover Railway stations
Railway stations in Great Britain opened in 1863
Railway stations served by Southeastern